Virginia Sachero (born 14 April 1961) is an Argentine swimmer. She competed in two events at the 1984 Summer Olympics.

References

1961 births
Living people
Argentine female swimmers
Pan American Games competitors for Argentina
Swimmers at the 1979 Pan American Games
Swimmers at the 1983 Pan American Games
Swimmers at the 1987 Pan American Games
Olympic swimmers of Argentina
Swimmers at the 1984 Summer Olympics
Place of birth missing (living people)
20th-century Argentine women